The OTI Festival 1976 is the fifth edition of the annual OTI Festival. It took place in Acapulco, Mexico, following the country's victory at the 1975 contest with the song "La felicidad" by Gualberto Castro. Organised by the Organización de Televisión Iberoamericana (OTI) and host broadcaster Televisa, the contest was held at the Ruiz de Alarcon Theatre on Saturday 30 October 1976 and was hosted by Raúl Velasco and Susana Dosamantes. It was the second time that Raúl Velasco had hosted the event, as he also hosted the 1974 contest at the same venue, making him the first person to host the contest twice.

As happened in the previous two years, the festival repeated the record of 19 participating countries with their respective broadcasters and performers established back in the same city in 1974. The winner was Spain, which was represented by the singer-songwriter María Ostiz with her song "Canta cigarra" (Cicada, start singing).

Background 
According to the original rules of the OTI Festival, the winning country of the previous year would organise the contest of the following year. In this case, Mexico, with their broadcaster Televisa and their performer Gualberto Castro, were the winners of the previous year's edition of the event with the song "La felicidad" (The happiness).

As the host country, the broadcaster Televisa was going to be the organiser of this year's edition, for that reason the top members of Televisa arranged a meeting in order to decide the day, the city and the venue where the contest would be held.

Mexico City was proposed as the host city due to its good infrastructure to host international events, but as happened two years before, the members decided that Acapulco was the most suitable city due to the municipality's prestigious reputation as a tourist centre both for mass tourism and for convention and congress purposes.

Venue 

The Ruiz de Alarcon Theatre was chosen again as the venue for the fifth edition of the OTI Festival.

In the meeting it was decided that the most suitable venue for the festival was the Ruiz de Alarcón theatre. The Ruiz de Alarcon Theatre of Acapulco was a highly vanguardist building that was started in 1969 and ended in 1973, few months before the theatre was chosen as the OTI Festival venue back in 1974. Since then, the theatre had hosted uncountable events, theatre shows, concerts and festivals.

This theatre is the host place of the Acapulco Philharmonic Orchestra and has a seat capacity for over 2000 people, which makes it a lot bigger than the previous year's venue in San Juan.

The stage was divided into two sides: The central part, where the singers performed their songs and the philharmonic orchestral zone that surrounded the central side.

Participating countries 
The number of participating countries repeated the previously established record of 19 countries that was reached in the same city two years before and repeated the last year. As happened in the previous editions, both the state financed and the privately funded TV and Radio stations that were members of OTI (Iberoamerican Television Organisation) participated in the event sending their entrant and competing song.

Some of the participating countries such as Mexico, Guatemala and Chile selected their entrants through live-broadcast national finals in order to select their participants. Other broadcasters with more or less resources decided to select their entrant and song internally.

Among the participating countries, it must be taken into account the debut of Costa Rica, whose broadcaster confirmed their participation, selected their song and sent a delegation to Acapulco. This fact makes Costa Rica the last Central American country to debut in the event.

Bolivia and the Dominican Republic decided to withdraw from the event. Both the Andean country and the Caribbean island took the decision of taking a one-year break due to their disappointing previous placings.

Honduras and its broadcaster, which had withdrawn in the previous edition also because of their disappointing results, decided to make their return, selecting internally their representative in the event.

Participating performers 
The winner of the "Chilean National OTI Contest" the Chilean national final to select their entrant, was, for a second time, Jose Alfredo Fuentes, who had won the same selection process two years before. As a result, he made a stellar return to Acapulco, the same Mexican city where he had previously represented his home country.

The Mexican entrant, and the winner of the enormously popular televised national final that Televisa used to produce every year, was Gilberto Valenzuela who was selected to represent Mexico with his song "De que te quiero te quiero" (If I say I love you It's because I love you) which instantaneously turned into one of the favourite contestants.

María Ostiz, the Spanish representative had already established herself a career in Spain and was selected by RTVE with her song "Canta cigarra", which was a protest song.

The Venezuelan entrants, the popular Disco band Las Cuatro Monedas, were selected internally by Venevision with their song "Soy" (I am).

Presenters 
The journalist and well-known media personality Raúl Velasco was chosen by Televisa to host the OTI Festival. Velasco had already hosted the contest two years before in the same city. The other presenter was Susana Dosamantes who is also a well known TV celebrity thanks to her participation in many Telenovelas. The decision to select a telenovela actress as a co-mistress of ceremonies was taken because of the popularity of Mexican telenovelas both in the local audience and in the Latin American and also Spanish audience.

The presenters, after the opening act performed by the Acapulco Philharmonic Orchestra, made a brief speech highlighting the goals of the OTI Festival as a song contest and the goals of the Iberoamerican Telecommunications Organisation. The speech was pronounced both in Spanish and Portuguese languages.

Just like in the previous years, the master and mistress of ceremonies made brief presentations of the performing artists short before they took the stage.

Running order 
As happened in previous years, the host broadcaster, in this case Televisa in collaboration with the Iberoamerican Television Organisation (OTI) organised a draw in Mexico City few days before the event took place.

The performance round was opened by the Ecuadorian entrant Tito del Salto with his song "Esos veinte años" (Those twenty years) which received a moderate to cold welcome.

The host country México and its representative Gilberto Valenzuela was the sixth one to take the stage with his song "De que te quiero te quiero", which counted from his selection with a high support base by the audience.

The Spanish entrant María Ostiz, who did not seem to have much fan support, was the second to last to enter in the stage, while the Puerto Rican representative Edward was the one to end the performance round.

As an interesting fact, absolutely all the competing songs from all the participating countries were sung in Spanish. Even the Brazilian performer Denise de Kalafe, who was the fifth one to enter the stage, performed her song in Spanish. This highly controversial decision was taken by Rede Globo, the Brazilian broadcaster, in order to get more points from the rest of the Latin American countries, which were mainly Spanish-speaking states.

Voting system 
The voting system followed the same process of the previous years in which the national juries were contacted telephonically by the presenters. All the juries from the participating countries were composed, as usual, by five professional jurors, who elected, each one, only their favourite song among the participating entries.

The national juries of every participating country were contacted directly by telephone by the presenters from the Ruiz de Alarcón Theatre in Acapulco in order to know the decision of the jurors. The jury members of Mexico, the host country, were located in the central studios of Televisa in Mexico City.

Voting process 
The show was characterised by an unusually tense voting process in which only three countries were the most likely to win the contest. This time the national juries were not contacted by the running order but aleatorily. Spain, Venezuela and Chile were the countries that were scoring the most points during the most of the process. From these ones, Chile was precisely the country that was heading the scoreboard until their jury was contacted. The Chilean jurors gave all their votes to Spain and Venezuela, which eventually and unexpectedly changed the final result of the process.

Result 
The countries that ended in the top three places in this year's edition were only separated by one point of difference.

After the Chilean jurors gave their votes, Spain, represented by María Ostiz, turned unexpectedly into the winner of the fifth edition of the event with her song "Canta Cigarra" (Sing Cicada). In fact, Spain turned into the first and the only non-American country to win the contest.

The second place was awarded to the Venezuelan entrants, the band Las Cuatro Monedas with their disco track "Soy". Their also unexpected second position was also caused by the decision of the Chilean jurors, who gave part of their votes to their entry.

The third position was for the Chilean performer José Alfredo Fuentes and his melody "Era solo un chiquillo". This entry was the one that was leading the voting process until their jurors were contacted.

There was a tie in the fourth place between the Brazilian entrant Denise de Kalafe, and Amparito, the performer from neighbouring Colombia. Both entries were warmly welcomed by the juries, but their songs didn't manage to get the most of the attention.

Unlike the previous year, when three countries ended in the last place with no points, this time only one country, the United States, represented by Carmen Moreno ended the last with zero points and a more than icy welcome.

Audience and impact 
This time without the technical difficulties during the broadcast of the show, the audience returned to the viewing figures of two hundred million viewers that the festival got two years before in the same city.

The winner María Ostiz was already an established artist in Spain, especially thanks to her songs that usually revolved around the tough life of the rural population in the 1970s Spain. Their songs used to have a cheerful spirit, although her song in the festival was completely different. "Canta cigarra" was a sad and pessimistic protest song in which the farmers, the women, the oppressed people with their hopelessness and hunger were mentioned as main elements. The selection of such a controversial song as the Spanish entry was attributed to the fall of the censorship after the death of the dictator Francisco Franco.

When the OTI Festival was being held, "Canta cigarra" was one of the least favoured entries in the betting odds due to the unusual simplicity of its production. While the voting process was taking place, Ostiz who was not confident about the possibilities of her song in the contest left the green room and went to the hotel. When her victory was clear after the decisive Chilean votes she had to return to the stage dressed on her casual clothes.

The second classificates the Venezuelan Disco-Fussion band "Las Cuatro Monedas" were also already famous in their country with eleven years of trajectory. They were famous for uniting the Disco rhythms with the Jamaican and Caribbean influences. Thanks to their second place the prestige of their career was confirmed in Venezuela.

The third Classificate, the Chilean Jose Alfredo Fuentes also saw his career consolidated due to his third place in the festival improving significantly the eight place he got back in 1974 in the same city.

One of the fourth classificates, the Brazilian entrant Denise de Kalafe, who was tied with the Colombian representative, had already represented her country in 1970 in the "Festival Mundial de la Canción Latina", the antecessor of the OTI Festival in 1970. with her fourth place in 1976 with her song "María de las flores" (Flower Mary) she started generating interest, not only in her country Brazil, but also in Mexico where her popularity started rising. Two years later in 1978, she would return to the festival turning into the winner of the event.

See also 
 Eurovision Song Contest 1976

References

External links 
 OTI Festival 1976
 Winner of the OTI Festival 1976

OTI Festival by year
Music festivals in Mexico
1976 in Latin music
1976 music festivals
1976 in Mexico
1976 in Mexican television
Televisa